Zakamensk is a town in the Republic of Buryatia, Russia.

Zakamensk may also refer to:
Zakamensk Urban Settlement, a municipal formation into which the Town of Zakamensk and Kholtosonsky Selsoviet in Zakamensky District of the Republic of Buryatia, Russia are incorporated
Zakamensk Airport, an airport in Russia served by Bural airline

See also
Zakamensky District